Metabus is a genus of long-jawed orb-weavers that was first described by Octavius Pickard-Cambridge in 1899.

Species
 it contains four species, found in Ecuador, Mexico, the Dominican Republic, Guatemala, and French Guiana:
Metabus conacyt Álvarez-Padilla, 2007 – Mexico, Guatemala
Metabus debilis (O. Pickard-Cambridge, 1889) – Mexico to Ecuador
Metabus ebanoverde Álvarez-Padilla, 2007 – Guatemala, Dominican Rep.
Metabus ocellatus (Keyserling, 1864) (type) – Mexico to French Guiana

In synonymy:
M. gravidus O. Pickard-Cambridge, 1899 = Metabus ocellatus (Keyserling, 1864)

See also
 List of Tetragnathidae species

References

Araneomorphae genera
Taxa named by Octavius Pickard-Cambridge
Tetragnathidae